Fabian Majcherski (born 28 March 1997) is a Polish volleyball player.

Sporting achievements

Clubs
 National championships
 2017/2018  Polish Cup, with Trefl Gdańsk

Individual awards
 2018: Polish Cup – Best Defender

References

External links
 Player profile at PlusLiga.pl
 Player profile at Volleybox.net

1997 births
Living people
People from Lębork
Sportspeople from Pomeranian Voivodeship
Polish men's volleyball players
Trefl Gdańsk players